Da Lama ao Caos is the debut album by the Brazilian band Chico Science & Nação Zumbi. Released in 1994, the album presents a fusion of funk rock and maracatu and contributed for spreading the music of Pernambuco around the world. Da Lama ao Caos is considered the manifesto of the Manguebeat movement.

It was listed by Rolling Stone Brazil as one of the 100 best Brazilian albums in history (13th position). The magazine also voted its title track as the 22nd greatest Brazilian song.

Cover 
The album cover, conceived by director Hilton Lacerda, is a collage of images that appear to be "pixilated", with each pixel being a different collage. The back cover is picture of a crab's claw, purportedly zoomed-in so it becomes pixilated and it becomes clear that the image had been developed with a computer.

The first version of the artwork was in black-and-white with some blue shades, but the label refused it, demanding more colors, and that's how the final version was born.

Track listing 

 Tracks "Computadores Fazem Arte" and "Côco Dub (Afrociberdelia)" are not included in the vinyl version.

Personnel
Source:
Chico Science & Nação Zumbi
 Chico Science – vocals; samplers on "Lixo do Mangue"
 Lúcio Maia – guitars
 Alexandre Dengue - bass
 Toca Ogan - percussion and effects
 Canhoto - snare drum
 Gira - alfaia
 Gilmar Bolla 8 - alfaia
 Jorge du Peixe - alfaia

Special guests
 André Jungmann - berimbau on "Maracatu de Tiro Certeiro"
 Chico Neves - samplers on "Rios, Pontes & Overdrives", "A Cidade", "Samba Makossa", "Antene-se" and "Côco Dub (Afrociberdelia)"
 Liminha - shouting on "Lixo do Mangue"

Production
 Liminha - producer, mixer, recording engineer
 Jorge Davidson - artistic director
 Ronaldo Viana - mixing coordinator
 Guilherme Calicchio - recording engineer
 Vitor Farias - recording engineer
 Renato Muñoz - studio assistant
 Ricardo Garcia - technical assessor
 Alberto Fernandes - technical assessor
 Steve Hall - mastering
 Eddy Schreyer - mastering
 Recorded and mixed at Estúdio Nas Nuvens, Rio de Janeiro
 Mastered at Future Disc, Oregon
 Dolores & Morales - graphical project
 Fred Jordão - photography
 Luciana K - finisher
 Helder - illustrations, finisher
 Hilton Lacerda - comics text, finisher
 Cláudio Almeida - images/texts editing, finisher
 Estado da Arte - collaboration
 João Belian - collaboration

References 

1994 debut albums
Nação Zumbi albums
Mangue Bit albums